Maglić or Bački Maglić (Бачки Маглић) is a village located in the Bački Petrovac municipality, in the South Bačka District of Serbia. It is situated in the Autonomous Province of Vojvodina. The population of the village numbering 2,695 people (2002 census), of whom 2,426 are ethnic Serbs.

Name
In Serbian, the village is known as Maglić (Маглић), or formerly also "Bulkes" (Булкес) or "Buljkes" (Буљкес); in Croatian as Maglić; in Hungarian as Bulkeszi or Bulkesz; and in German as "Bulkes" (or Pfalzweiler).

History
Before the World War II, the village was called Buljkes, and was inhabited chiefly by ethnic Germans, settled here around 1786, mostly from Baden-Württemberg. In 1944, many of the residents fled ahead of the advancing Russian and Partisan troops. Under the newly enacted AVNOJ laws, in December 1944 the remaining residents were forced to relocate to the newly established concentration camp at Bački Jarak and the village was abandoned.

In May 1945, 4,650 Greek refugees, mostly male members of ELAS, settled in the village with the help of Yugoslav government. From 1945 to 1948, it was a sui generis case of Greek extraterritorial jurisdiction. The Yugoslav conflict with the Informbiro saw the Greek community divided between loyalty to Yugoslavia and to the Comintern, and those who supported the latter left the country. The remaining also emigrated to Greek Macedonia eventually, with only a few remaining.

The final settlement of the village started in late 1949, and ended around 1953. Settlers, chiefly Serbs, came in several waves, from all over the Yugoslavia. The village took the current name in 1949, after the Maglić mountain in eastern Herzegovina. The name partly evocates the sentiment of some settlers from that area, and partly subsumes the multi-original nature of the villagers, as it lies on junction of Bosnia, Herzegovina and Montenegro.

Historical population

Gallery

See also
List of places in Serbia
List of cities, towns and villages in Vojvodina

References
Slobodan Ćurčić, Broj stanovnika Vojvodine, Novi Sad, 1996.
Official website of Bački Petrovac: Maglić

External links 

https://web.archive.org/web/20160110221819/http://maglic.org/ — Site about Maglić

Places in Bačka
South Bačka District
Bački Petrovac